United India Colony is a sub-division of Kodambakkam, Chennai, India.
United India Colony is a planned residential area and is a relatively greener locality in Chennai.

Liberty Theater is the most famous landmark in United India Colony. Its one of the well known movie theaters in Chennai. United India Colony boasts of two famous schools namely Loyola Matriculation Higher Secondary School (for boys) and Fatima Matriculation Higher Secondary School (for girls). Anna Park, situated at the center of the colony, is a favourite hang-out spot for the residents here. The colony also has two famous churches - Fatima Church (Catholic) and CSI Church of the Risen Redeemer (Protestant). There is a famous Vinayagar temple in this locality.

Majority of the residents in United India Colony are Tamil Hindus. The colony is highly cosmopolitan. A good number of Telugu, Malayalam and Marwari speakers are also present here. With two major churches and two big Christian schools, the colony is also home to a good number of Christians. Both Diwali and Christmas are celebrated with the same fervour here.
The pincode for United India Colony is 600024.

Gallery

Neighbourhoods in Chennai